In number theory, a perfect digital invariant (PDI) is a number in a given number base that is the sum of its own digits each raised to a given power.

Definition
Let  be a natural number. The perfect digital invariant function (also known as a happy function, from happy numbers) for base  and power   is defined as:

where  is the number of digits in the number in base , and 

is the value of each digit of the number.

Numbers in base  lead to fixed or periodic points of numbers .

 is the digit sum. The only perfect digital invariants are the single-digit numbers in base , and there are no periodic points with prime period greater than 1.

No upper bound can be determined for the size of perfect digital invariants in a given base and arbitrary power, and it is not currently known whether or not the number of perfect digital invariants for an arbitrary base is finite or infinite.

F2,b
As a result, there are actually two related quadratic Diophantine equations to solve:
  when , and
  when .
The two-digit natural number  is a perfect digital invariant in base 
 

Then the Diophantine equation for the three-digit perfect digital invariant becomes 
 
 
 
 

F3,b

As a result, there are actually three related cubic Diophantine equations to solve
  when 
  when 
  when 
We take the first case, where .

b = 3k + 1 
Let  be a positive integer and the number base . Then:

b = 3k + 2 
Let  be a positive integer and the number base . Then:

b = 6k + 4 
Let  be a positive integer and the number base . Then:

Fp,b
All numbers are represented in base .

Extension to negative integers
Perfect digital invariants can be extended to the negative integers by use of a signed-digit representation to represent each integer.

Balanced ternary 
In balanced ternary, the digits are 1, −1 and 0. This results in the following:
 With even powers ,  indicates whether the number is even or odd, as the sum of each digit will indicate divisibility by 2 if and only if the sum of digits ends in 0.

Relation to happy numbers

Programming example
The example below implements the perfect digital invariant function described in the definition above to search for perfect digital invariants and cycles in Python. This can be used to find happy numbers.
def pdif(x: int, p: int, b: int) -> int:
    """Perfect digital invariant function."""
    total = 0
    while x > 0:
        total = total + pow(x % b, p)
        x = x // b
    return total

def pdif_cycle(x: int, p: int, b: int) -> list[int]:
    seen = []
    while x not in seen:
        seen.append(x)
        x = pdif(x, p, b)
    cycle = []
    while x not in cycle:
        cycle.append(x)
        x = pdif(x, p, b)
    return cycle

See also
 Arithmetic dynamics
 Dudeney number
 Factorion
 Happy number
 Kaprekar's constant
 Kaprekar number
 Meertens number
 Narcissistic number
 Perfect digit-to-digit invariant
 Sum-product number

References

External links
 Digital Invariants

Arithmetic dynamics
Base-dependent integer sequences
Diophantine equations